In American folklore, the hodag is a fearsome critter resembling a large bull-horned carnivore with a row of thick curved spines down its back. The hodag was said to be born from the ashes of cremated oxen, as the incarnation of the accumulation of  abuse the animals had suffered at the hands of their  masters. The history of the hodag is strongly tied to the City of Rhinelander where it was claimed to have been discovered. The hodag has figured prominently in early Paul Bunyan stories.

Origins
In 1893, newspapers reported the discovery of a hodag in Rhinelander, Wisconsin. The articles claimed the hodag had "the head of a frog, the grinning face of a giant elephant, thick short legs set off by huge claws, the back of a dinosaur, and a long tail with spears at the end". The reports were instigated by well-known Wisconsin land surveyor, timber cruiser and prankster Eugene Shepard, who rounded up a group of local people to capture the animal. The group reported that they needed to use dynamite to kill the beast.

A photograph of the remains of the charred beast was released to the media. It was "the fiercest, strangest, most frightening monster ever to set razor sharp claws on the earth. It became extinct after its main food source, all white bulldogs, became scarce in the area."

Hoax
Shepard claimed to have captured another hodag in 1896, and this one was captured alive. According to Shepard's reports, he and several bear wrestlers placed chloroform on the end of a long pole, which they worked into the cave of the creature where it was overcome.

He displayed this hodag at the first Oneida County fair. Thousands of people came to see the hodag at the fair or at Shepard's display in a shanty at his house. Having connected wires to it, Shepard would occasionally move the creature, which would typically send the already-skittish viewers fleeing the display.

As newspapers locally, statewide, and then nationally began picking up the story of the apparently remarkable living creature, a small group of scientists from the Smithsonian Institution in Washington, D.C. announced they would be traveling to Rhinelander to inspect the apparent discovery. Their mere announcement spelled the end, as Shepard was then forced to admit that the hodag was a hoax.

Aftermath

The hodag became the official symbol of Rhinelander, Wisconsin. It is the mascot of Rhinelander High School, and lends its name to numerous Rhinelander area businesses and organizations, including the annual music festival, Hodag Country Festival. The city of Rhinelander's web site calls Rhinelander "The Home of the Hodag". A larger-than-life fiberglass sculpture of a hodag, created by Tracy Goberville, a local artist, resides on the grounds of the Rhinelander Area Chamber of Commerce where it draws thousands of visitors each year. Rhinelander Ice Arena houses two hodags, one a full body creature just inside the entrance, and the other one an oversized head that blows smoke and has red eyes that light up, located in the corner just off the ice and which was created by the same artist who designed and built the Chamber Hodag.

References

External links
 Hodag History Video produced by Wisconsin Public Television
 JFK's Hodag - newspaper article about Hodag given to John F. Kennedy on his trip to Rhinelander in 1960
 What is the Hodag?

Fearsome critters
Wisconsin culture
Wisconsin folklore
Oneida County, Wisconsin
Rhinelander, Wisconsin
American legendary creatures